USS Interceptor (AGR-8/YAGR-8) was a  acquired by the US Navy in 1955, from the "mothballed" reserve fleet. She was reconfigured as a radar picket ship and assigned to radar picket duty in the North Pacific Ocean as part of the Distant Early Warning Line.

Construction
Interceptor (YAGR-8) was laid down on 10 July  1945, under a Maritime Commission (MARCOM) contract, MC hull 3147, as the Liberty Ship Edward W. Burton, by J.A. Jones Construction, Panama City, Florida. She was launched 12 September 1945; sponsored by Miss Juanita M. Kaylor; and delivered to T. J. Stevenson & Company, Inc., 8 November 1945.

Service history
She served several lines as a cargo ship until being placed in the National Defense Reserve Fleet at Wilmington, North Carolina, 20 June 1948.

Acquired by the Navy, 28 June 1955, the ship was converted to a radar picket ship at Charleston Naval Shipyard, Charleston, South Carolina, and commissioned Interceptor (YAGR-8), 15 February 1956.

Interceptor was designed to carry the latest in long-range radar and communications equipment and to act as an ocean radar station ship. Following shakedown training she sailed from Charleston, 17 March 1956, en route to her new home port, San Francisco, California.

Arriving via the Panama Canal, 11 April, the ship began a regular cycle of 3– to 4–week at–sea periods as a picket ship under the Continental Air Defense Command (CONAD). Operating with search aircraft, Interceptor could detect, track, and report aircraft at great distances as well as control interceptor aircraft in the event of an air attack on the United States.

Patrolling off the coast of Canada, she formed an integral part of North America's air early warning system. Reclassified AGR-8, radar picket ship, 28 September 1958, Interceptor, for the next 7 years, operated with NORAD, in forming an important link in the nation's defenses.

Decommissioning
Interceptor was struck from the Navy List 1 September 1965, and placed in the Suisun Bay Reserve Fleet, Suisun BayCalifornia, where she remained until sold for scrapping, 16 February 1978.

See also 
 United States Navy
 Radar picket

References

Bibliography

External links
 

 

Liberty ships
Ships built in Panama City, Florida
1945 ships
World War II merchant ships of the United States
Guardian-class radar picket ships
Cold War auxiliary ships of the United States
Wilmington Reserve Fleet
Suisun Bay Reserve Fleet